Youssef Izz al-Din Ahmad al-Samarrai (1922 – 8 April 2013) was an Iraqi poet and university professor. He was born and studied in the city of Baqubah. He worked as a primary teacher at the Primary Teacher's House, then joined the Faculty of Arts at Alexandria University where he obtained a BA in Arabic language and literature. Youssef Izz al-din has continued his studies there, receiving a master's degree, then a doctorate from the University of London. He was appointed as a teacher of modern Arabic literature at the College of Arts at the University of Baghdad. He was assigned to the iraqi scientific academy in 1961, then a general director of guidance at the ministry of culture. He was a member of the royal society of literature in London, and the scientific academy in Cairo, Damascus, Jordan, and Iraq. He has many poetry collections and a large number of books, studies and lectures that he delivered. He died in Britain.

Biography 

Dr. Youssef Ezz Al-Din Bin Al-Sayed Ahmed Al-Samarrai Al-Baqoubi (1922 – 8 April 2013) was an Arab writer and thinker and an important figure from among the prominent figures in Iraq and the contemporary Arabs. He had four children, Dr. Asel is a surgeon and university professor, Dr. Moel is a professor of sharia at the University of Wales and Qatar, Dr. Saad is an expert in geology, and Ms. Nada is a lecturer in management. His wife, Mrs. Khairiya Rasheed Al-Sabri, died on April 21, 2001. He is the brother of the manuscript scholar Dr. Qassem Al-Samarrai.

He began his literary life as a poet and playwright, then completed his literary studies and worked at the University of Baghdad and other Arabic universities. He held high positions in the field of culture and media (it was called propaganda and media at that time), and worked as Secretary of the Iraqi Scientific Academy, succeeding Dr. Naji Al-Aseel until his departure from Iraq in (1979). During which he continued his intellectual and literary research and published excerpts from his biography in more than one book. He also published the novels “Heart on Travel” and “The Emigrant Seagull” and a collection of stories (Three Virgins). In addition to his poetry collections and his critical and literary research. In (2001) he retired from university work as a result of his friend's insistence and his physical suffering. His wife passed away during that time and he had no one left to fill the emptiness of the house. Before that, he was nearly eighty, an age that requires resting and staying calm, but he was attached to work. Iraq's political conditions were still thorny at that time, and did not encourage him to return to his locked home in Adhamiya since he left. Among those equations, the choice of work and the atmosphere of brotherhood and love surrounded by his friends was more likely than others.

Youssef Ezz Al-Din bin Al-Sayed Ahmed bin Al-Sayed Abdul-Razzaq Al-Samarrai was born in Baqubah at the beginning of the third decade of the 20th century. He died in Carmarthen, Wales and was buried with his wife in the Muslim cemetery in Swansea, Wales. His father was an officer in the Ottoman army, and he participated in the battles of this army in Anatolia and Caucasus, as well as other wars that the Ottoman Empire fought against its enemies, even though the first war, 1914–1918, ended with the defeat of the Ottoman Empire. Some of the Iraqi and Arab officers who returned to their country, and it was known on the authority of his father, his generosity, fathers, and good morals, and he was called the master. The family used to live in the city of Samarra, and it ruled the guardians of the two sanctified kindergartens of the two venerable Imams Al-Hasan Al-Askari and Ali Al-Hadi. There is fierce bloodshed between the two parties, which prompted the governor of Baghdad, Daoud Pasha to prepare a military campaign to disengage, spare the blood of brothers and cousins, and punish the offenders. The family dispersed to various parts of Iraq, neighboring countries, and beyond. Some became Rajat in India, while others resided in Iran whenever he wanted. His ancestors lived in Diyala Brigade for a long period of time.

Youssef Ezz al-din began as a teacher in his 30s and early 40s in the villages of Diyala Governorate, then as a teacher between his 40s and early 50s in Baghdad. He then worked as a professor at the University of Baghdad between (1957-1978) and dean of postgraduate studies in the universities of the Emirates, Riyadh, and Taif (1979-2001). He also worked as a teacher and lecturer at the Institute of Graduate Studies at the Arab League during the 1960s. Professor Youssef Ezz Al-din contributed to building cultural and literary edifices in addition to his educational and university work, including establishing the public library in the city center of Baquba. During his work in primary education; The establishment of the Iraqi Writers and Authors Association, the establishment of Al-Kitab Magazine - the mouthpiece of the Iraqi Writers, and Authors Association, Establishment of the cultural pens magazine, which was included in the publications of the Iraqi Ministry of Culture; Supervising the management and organization of the works and facilities of the Iraqi Scientific Complex during the 60s and 70s, where he was the secretary of the complex during the secretariat of Naji Al-Aseel and then its general secretary until his departure from Iraq (1978). This confirms the active and active role in the Iraqi culture movement between the fifties and seventies of the last century, including festivals, seminars and cultural conferences, the Al-Kindi and Ibn Rushd festivals, Arab and international cultural, and scientific events. He was an active member of the Arabic Language Academy in Cairo, and he did not stop actively attending one of its courses until his last illness. Despite his preoccupations and the accumulation of his health and family burdens, he was keen to prepare two papers annually to participate in the sessions of the complex. He enjoyed the love and appreciation of the members of the complex, the Egyptian cultural community and the Egyptian press. He had clear positions and opinions on current topics such as modernity and renewal of the Arabic language, and foreign vocabulary in the Arabic language at the level of the media and the street. In addition to his work in the Iraqi Academic Academy (later Dar Al-Hikma Foundation) and his role in the Arabic Language Academy in Cairo, he was a member of the Language and Translation Academies in Damascus and Delhi and the Comparative Literature Associations in Britain, Canada, the United States, and elsewhere.

He resided in Wales after his retirement, continuing his writing and research, and re-reviewing and re-publishing some of his books. Among the most prominent of his recent books (political poetry in modern Iraq), the investigation of the book (Al-Rusafi tells his memories) which is one of the old manuscripts that date the last years of Al-Rusafi in his 40s. He reviewed and published it after investigating three copies between a manuscript and a partial publication. It turned out it was published and reproduced more than once, and it is the only book on the biography of the poet and thinker Al-Rasafi, especially after the publication of his unique book, The Personality of Muhammad, published by Dar al-Jamal in Germany. In recent years, his physical pain has gotten worse and he had difficulty seeing and moving. The eye surgeries have not helped him much, in addition to joint and leg pain. Two years ago, he stopped attending the periodic annual meetings of the Academy of the Arabic Language in Cairo, which he has continued to attend since the 1980s. In recent months, Youssef Izz has worked on a book entitled "Violence in Iraq", which deals with background of the events after the American invasion. He also completed his translation of the American Walt Whitman, which he had begun years before.

As one of his peers said. "The avenue of life was not furnished in front of him with roses or the red carpet... he tasted the bitterness of life, the hardship of life, the sterility of alienation, the sulking of many, and the treachery of time... the earth under his feet and the sky above him and his back to the wall...what drives A boy in his early twenties to quit playing and fooling around and go to write newspapers and regularly provide a newsletter about his city (Baqubah) in the thirties of the last century! He will be the youngest and first journalist in his quiet city on the banks of the winding Diyala River to meet the Tigris near Baghdad. When the British planes struck the cities and villages of Iraq in the wake of the blessed twenty-first revolution, he was forty days old, and he was (the son of the revolution that remained - with him - all his life), according to his expression, but he transformed the revolution into thought, literature and love, so his revolution spread from the gardens of Baqubah to overflow beyond the borders of Iraq to the country of the English (especially) and the whole world."

Between the late 1930s and the beginning of the 21st century more than 60 years, which is the literary age of Dr. Youssef Ezzedine; He started out as a poet and continued his career with the ember of poetry in his soul. This stage, which was dropped from the study for everyone who dealt with the poetics of Youssef Ezzedine and his literary and intellectual personality as a result of the interruption of reasons and the nature of the prevailing political conditions, is the most important stages of the poet's life and features of his intellectual and cultural formation, which remained imprinted in his conscience and thought and found its secrets on all his poetry, prose and thought in the later stages.

From poetry to studying 

There are reasons that was collected for the masses that have been busy since 2004. I worked in primary education 1941-1946 and if I had not been removed from the library and felt insulting to the Director of Education, my life would have gone on at the same pace. The writer in the study is a habitat .. in which a chapter calms down from the agitation of the political and ideological conflict in the length and breadth of the country, and the disdain of those in charge of matters of two feelings. So, he moved to a new stage of patriotic and national work on the other hand, and smelled and wonderful on the one hand, and spread his thoughts and discussions around the world. Look, look at the study of thought. He did not hide in the shelves of libraries and the valleys of history, as he was and what, and many of the research students and certificates waited. 2- Arranging his studies in tracing the social/political approach. 3- Choosing the method of historical succession in continuing his literary and intellectual studies.

It never ends in realistic perspective. pages, pages, pages, offers, offers, offers sorted! He wrote, beginning with poetry in the nineteenth century (Master's thesis), and continued with the beginning of the Second World War (1938). During which he published his book (Iraqi Poets in the Twentieth Century Twentieth Century). ) / c 1 The second part is still awaiting publication. The study also indicates that you can finish the study and use and additions that you achieve in the previous table. It is an opportunity to submit it to print as soon as possible and he did, because he did it in person. He will be the first researcher to deal with the longest interlocking period of contemporary history, with the same consistent and convergent approach and vision! On the same level. The doctor was interested in studying the emergence and development of the arts of story, novel and modern thought in Iraq. He presented his systematic historical reading of Iraqi culture after that we may contemplate the doctor's keenness and integrated vision and the spirit of perseverance and determination that led him through the paths of thought and life!.]

He used to prepare cultural signs about news of literary activities in his city of Baqubah and send them to newspapers and magazines in Baghdad. Emotional and human emotion dominates in his early poetry. In a village (in front of Askar), he wrote a poetic play, the opposite, the opposite, the opposite, the opposite, the giving, the giving, the giving, the giving, the giving, the giving, the giving, and they are early. It is one of the effects of Marxist and socialist books and publications that he was exchanging with his colleague Youssef Abdel Masih Tharwat at the time. , long, symbolic, and his writings, true, true, true, true, true, saham, or what was buried underground and damaged in the second occupation airport of Iraq, the 1941 national sentence. Firewood in 1942 in Alexandria to obtain a Bachelor of Arts and then a master's degree. There begins a new stage in his other literary life. In 1950, his first poetry collection entitled (In the Conscience of Time) and then the second entitled (Melodies) in 1953 originated from his poetry written in Egypt. His poetic career was divided into several stages.

Pre-1941 stage (the beginning), during his early years, he tried to extract a draft of his poetic plays (The Farmer, Three Virgins) from his old archive in Baghdad for reconsideration.
Al-Masrya Al-Masryah (1942-1953), its printing press, issued in Diwans and published in the Egyptian press.
The academic stage After his return to Baghdad, the academic, research and intellectual tendency prevailed over his literary personality and was reflected in his poetry in terms of quantity. Anthle in his collections: (Life's Psalms) / 1960, and (From the Life's Journey) / 1969, Motivated by (Folded Love Whispers) Al-Ahkam (1988).
- The stage of exile after leaving Iraq (1978) and distributed between Saudi Arabia and the United Arab Emirates. Nostalgia, pain and the struggles of alienation and separation are common in his poetry, and he can be considered his two groups (Why, Baghdad) and (So, Baghdad) as a representation of them. This stage is also represented in writing independent poetry in books, including: (The Pains of a Poet) / 1991, (Drinking Salt) / 1992, (The Confused Tone) / 1993, (The Echo Returns) / 1994. In an exhibition of one of his most beautiful poetry.
This place will remain empty by my side as long as I have time  سيبقى خاليا هذا المكانُ		بجنبي ما أطال بي الزمانُ

His wife died in 2000 and then he retired from his university work in 2000. After three years of illness, he died on 8 April 2013.

Publications

Poetry 

 In the Conscience of Time poetry collection 1950 - Alexandria 
 Composed by poetry collection 1953 - Alexandria 
 Life's breath poetry collection 1960 - Beirut 
 From the journey of life poetry collection 1967 - Baghdad 
 Folded Whispers of Love Poetry poetry collection 1987 - Cairo 
 Echo of Taif poetry collection 1992 - Al-Taif 
 Drinking salt poem 1992 – Cairo 
 The confused melody poem 1992 - Cairo 
 Days were lost poem 1992 – Cairo 
 The pains of a poet's poem poem 1993 – Cairo 
 He does not know his fate poem 1994 - Cairo 
 The echo came back poem 1994 - Cairo 
 Wafaa Al-Hassan poetry play 1994 - Cairo 
 Nostalgia Whisper poetry collection 1997 - Cairo 
 So, Baghdad! poetry collection 2001 - Cairo

Narratives 

 Heart on Travel 1975 – Cairo 
 Three Virgins, a collection of stories 1987 – Riyadh 
 The Migrant Seagull 1992 – Cairo 
 The memory returned with its oddities and anecdotes (the days of high school) 1988 - Cairo  
 To Forbidden Homes (China and the Soviet Union) 1989 – Cairo  21- Sweet and Bitter Memories (His Story) 1992 – Cairo

Literary studies 
 Iraqi Poetry in the 19th Century- Its Characteristics and Objectives 1958 – Baghdad 
 Modern Iraqi Poetry and Political and Social Currents 1960 - Baghdad 
 Khairy Al Hindawi - His Life and Poetry 1965 - Baghdad 
 In Modern Arabic Literature (Yahout and Articles Criticisms) 1967 - Baghdad 
 Socialism and nationalism and their impact on modern Arabic poetry 1968 - Cairo 
 Iraq's poets in the twentieth century- part 1 1969 - Baghdad 
 The novel in Iraq- its development and the impact of thought on it 1973 - Cairo 
 The story in Iraq - its roots and development 1974 - Cairo 
 Ibrahim Saleh Shukr- and early modern prose in Iraq 1975 - Cairo 
 A saying in criticism and modernity of literature 1978 - Riyadh 
 Chapters in modern literature and criticism 1981 - Riyadh  
 Renewal in modern poetry - its psychological motives and intellectual roots 1986 - Jeddah  
 Between Modernity and Conservatism - A Critical Study of Contemporary Poetry 1990 - ....
 The Impact of Arabic Literature on the Path of Western Literature 1990 - Riyadh   
 Critical opinions that survived the valley 1992 - Cairo 
 Old does not die and new does not live - Critical opinions Aha in Modernity and Literature) 1996 - Cairo  
 A manuscript of the poetry of Al-Akhras d. T.

Intellectual issues 
 One of the pioneers of modern thought in Iraq - Fahmy al-Modarres 1969 – Cairo 
 The development of modern thought 1976- Baghdad/ Iraq 41 – Issues from Arab thought 1978 - Cairo 
 Civilizational challenge and intellectual invasion 1405 AH- Riyadh/ Saudi Arabia 43- Our Heritage and Contemporary 1987 – Cairo

Date 
 Daoud Pasha and the end of the Mamluks in Iraq 1967 – Baghdad 
 Arabic manuscripts in Sophia National Library 1968 – Baghdad 
 Al-Nusra in Basra News (investigation)  1969 – Baghdad

Other language publications 
 Poetry and Iraqi Society: 1900–1945 1962 - Baghdad  
 Modern Iraqi Poetry, Social and Influences 1971 - Cairo 
 Songs from Baghdad to London 1984
 La Spontaneite by Drya Najm, 1986 - Cairo

References 

1922 births
2013 deaths
20th-century Iraqi poets
Iraqi academics
Alexandria University alumni
21st-century Iraqi poets